Alyxia is an Australasian genus of flowering plant in the dogbane family, Apocynaceae. It contains at present 106 species, but Alyxia stellata and A. tisserantii are very variable, might be cryptic species complexes, and are need of further study. It consists of shrubby, climbing or scrambling plants. This genus occurs in China, the Himalayas, Southeast Asia, Australia, New Caledonia and the Pacific Islands. There are 14 species in Australia, 21 in New Caledonia and 7 in the other Pacific Islands, including Hawaii.

The leaves are opposite or in whorls of three to seven. There are colleters (groups or tufts of mucilaginous secretory hairs) present in the leaf axils. The inflorescence is axillary or terminal with solitary flowers or simple cymes. Flowers consist of five petals and five sepals. The flowers have a slender tube which expands abruptly. The stamens have short filaments and are inserted in the upper half of the corolla. The fruit is a pair of drupes, originating from each flower.

Dysentery bush (A. buxifolia) is used in herbalism and was made into a patented remedy by Albert Aspinall. Maile (A. oliviformis), endemic to the Hawaiian Islands, has sweet-smelling leaves and is much used for lei; formerly it was reserved for alii (nobility), but today it can be used by anyone and is a popular wedding decoration on the islands. Maile also provides food for Thyrocopa caterpillars and belid weevils of the genus Proterhinus.  Alyxia spp. are also used in Jamu.

Species
The following is a list of Alyxia species accepted by Plants of the World Online as at September 2021:

 Alyxia acuminata K.Schum. (New Guinea)
 Alyxia angustifolia Ridl. (Malaysia, Philippines)
 Alyxia angustissima Merr. & Quisumb. (Philippines)
 Alyxia annamensis Pit. (Indo-China)
 Alyxia arfakensis Kaneh. & Hatus. (New Guinea)
 Alyxia baillonii Guillaumin (New Caledonia)
 Alyxia balansae Pit. (China, Vietnam)
 Alyxia bracteolosa Rich. ex A.Gray (south-west Pacific Ocean)
 Alyxia buxifolia R.Br. – dysentery bush, sea box (South Australia)
 Alyxia cacuminum Markgr. (New Guinea)
 Alyxia caletioides (Baill.) Guillaumin (New Caledonia)
 Alyxia celebica D.J.Middleton (Sulawesi)
 Alyxia clusiophylla (Baill.) Guillaumin (New Caledonia)
 Alyxia composita Warb. (New Guinea)
 Alyxia concatenata (Blanco) Merr. (Philippines)
 Alyxia cylindrocarpa  Guillaumin (New Caledonia)
 Alyxia defoliata Markgr. (New Guinea)
 Alyxia efatensis Guillaumin (Vanuatu)
 Alyxia erythrosperma Gillespie (Fiji)
 Alyxia evansii D.J.Middleton (Northern Territory)
 Alyxia fascicularis (Wall. ex G.Don) Benth. ex Hook.f. (India, Thailand)
 Alyxia floribunda Markgr. (New Guinea)
 Alyxia funingensis Tsiang & P.T.Li (China, Myanmar)
 Alyxia ganophylla Markgr. (Malaysia, Borneo)
 Alyxia glaucophylla Van Heurck & Müll.Arg. (New Caledonia)
 Alyxia globosa D.J.Middleton (Sulawesi)
 Alyxia graciliflora D.J.Middleton (Papua New Guinea)
 Alyxia gracilis (Wall. ex A.DC.) Benth. ex Hook.f. (India, Bangladesh)
 Alyxia grandis P.I.Forst. (Queensland)
 Alyxia gynopogon Roem. & Schuit. (Norfolk Island)
 Alyxia hainanensis Merr. & Chun (China, Vietnam)
 Alyxia halmaheirae Miq. (Sulawesi to Maluku)
 Alyxia hurlimannii Guillaumin (New Caledonia)
 Alyxia ilicifolia F.Muell. (Queensland)
 Alyxia kaalaensis Boiteau (New Caledonia)
 Alyxia kabaenae Markgr. (Sulawesi)
 Alyxia kendarica Markgr. (Sulawesi)
 Alyxia kwalotabaa D.J.Middleton (Bismarck Archipelago)
 Alyxia lackii D.J.Middleton (Sulawesi)
 Alyxia lamii Markgr. (New Guinea)
 Alyxia laurina Gaudich. (New Guinea)
 Alyxia leucogyne Van Heurck & Müll.Arg. (New Caledonia)
 Alyxia linearis Markgr. (Philippines)
 Alyxia loeseneriana Schltr. (New Caledonia)
 Alyxia longiloba D.J.Middleton (Papua New Guinea)
 Alyxia luzonensis Merr. (Philippines)
 Alyxia magnifolia F.M.Bailey (Queensland)
 Alyxia manusiana D.J.Middleton (Bismarck Archipelago)
 Alyxia margaretae Boiteau (New Caledonia)
 Alyxia marginata Pit. (Cambodia, Vietnam)
 Alyxia markgrafii Tsiang (New Guinea)
 Alyxia menglungensis Tsiang & P.T.Li (China)
 Alyxia microphylla Markgr. (New Guinea)
 Alyxia minutiflora D.J.Middleton (Sulawesi)
 Alyxia monticola C.B.Rob. (Taiwan, Philippines)
 Alyxia mucronata D.J.Middleton (New Caledonia)
 Alyxia muguma D.J.Middleton (Philippines)
 Alyxia mujongensis Markgr. (Borneo)
 Alyxia multistriata Markgr. (New Guinea)
 Alyxia nathoi Trân Ðinh Lý
 Alyxia oblongata Domin (New Guinea, Queensland)
 Alyxia obovatifolia Merr. (Philippines)
 Alyxia oleifolia King & Gamble (Malesia)
 Alyxia oppositifolia Boiteau (New Caledonia)
 Alyxia orophila Domin (Queensland)
 Alyxia oubatchensis (Schltr.) Guill. ex Boiteau (New Caledonia)
 Alyxia palawanensis Markgr. (Borneo, Philippines, Sulawesi)
 Alyxia papuana D.J.Middleton (Papua New Guinea)
 Alyxia parvifolia (Merr.) Merr. (Philippines)
 Alyxia pilosa Miq. (Malaysia)
 Alyxia podocarpa Van Heurck & Müll.Arg. (New Caledonia)
 Alyxia poyaensis (Boiteau) D.J.Middleton (New Caledonia)
 Alyxia pseudosinensis Pit. (Indo-China)
 Alyxia pugio Markgr. (Papua New Guinea)
 Alyxia pullei Markgr. (New Guinea)
 Alyxia punctata Kaneh. & Hatus. (New Guinea)
 Alyxia purpureoclada Kaneh. & Hatus. (New Guinea)
 Alyxia racemosa Pit. (Vietnam)
 Alyxia reinwardtii Blume (China, Philippines, Bali)
 Alyxia ridleyana Wernham (New Guinea)
 Alyxia rostrata Markgr. (New Guinea)
 Alyxia royeniana Wernham (New Guinea)
 Alyxia rubricaulis Baill. Guimaumin (New Caledonia)
 Alyxia ruscifolia R.Br. (Australia) – chain fruit
 Alyxia sarasini Guimaumin (New Caledonia)
 Alyxia scabrida Markgr. (Papua New Guinea)
 Alyxia schlechteri H.Lév. (China, Thailand)
 Alyxia semipallescens F. Muell. (New Guinea)
 Alyxia siamensis Craib (China, Indo-China)
 Alyxia sinensis Champ. ex Benth. (China, Vietnam, Taiwan)
 Alyxia sleumeri Markgr. (New Guinea)
 Alyxia sogerensis Wernham ex S.Moore (New Guinea)
 Alyxia solomonensis D.J.Middleton (Solomon Islands)
 Alyxia spicata R.Br.
 Alyxia squamulosa C.Moore & F.Muell.
 Alyxia stellata (J.R.Forst. & G.Forst.) Roem. & Schult.
 Alyxia sulana Markgr. (Sulawesi, Maluku)
 Alyxia tetanifolia Cranfield (Western Australia)
 Alyxia tetraquetra Markgr. (New Guinea)
 Alyxia thailandica D.J.Middleton (Thailand)
 Alyxia tisserantii Montrouz. (New Caledonia)
 Alyxia torquata Baill. Guimaumin (New Caledonia)
 Alyxia tropica (P.I.Forst.) D.J.Middleton (Northern Territory)
 Alyxia uniflora D.J.Middleton (Sulawesi)
 Alyxia veillonii D.J.Middleton (New Caledonia)
 Alyxia vera D.J.Middleton (Maluku)

References

 
Apocynaceae genera